Henry Fortescue may refer to:

Henry Fortescue (died 1576) (by 1515–1576), English MP for Maldon and Sudbury
Henry Fortescue (Lord Chief Justice) (fl. 1426), Lord Chief Justice of Ireland